Pfeiffer's red bat (Lasiurus pfeifferi) is a species of bat from the family Vespertilioninae and is endemic to Cuba. It is listed as Near Threatened by the IUCN Red List due to a significant population decline, caused by human population density on its endemic island, habitat conversion, and hurricanes. The species is likely insectivorous; fecal matter samples from a single bat contained only beetles. It may be a subspecies of the Seminole bat.

See also 

 Seminole bat

References 

Lasiurus
Bats of the Caribbean
Endemic fauna of Cuba
Mammals of Cuba
Near threatened fauna of North America
Taxa named by Juan Gundlach
Mammals described in 1861